Vrachia is a village and a community of the Delta municipality. Before the 2011 local government reform it was part of the municipality of Axios, of which it was a municipal district. The 2011 census recorded 557 inhabitants in the village. The community of Vrachia covers an area of 15.036 km2.

See also
 List of settlements in the Thessaloniki regional unit

References

Populated places in Thessaloniki (regional unit)